Karl Yngve Liljeberg (23 July 1909 – 5 October 1978) was a Swedish ice hockey player. He competed in the men's tournament at the 1936 Winter Olympics. Liljeberg played for Nacka SK and IK Göta.

Liljeberg played football for Djurgårdens IF Fotboll in the 1935–36 season and for Djurgårdens IF Bandy in 1940 and 1941 seasons.

References

1909 births
1978 deaths
Ice hockey players at the 1936 Winter Olympics
Olympic ice hockey players of Sweden
Ice hockey people from Stockholm
Swedish ice hockey players					
IK Göta Ishockey players
Swedish footballers
Djurgårdens IF Fotboll players
Swedish bandy players
Djurgårdens IF Bandy players